Buckleria negotiosus is a moth of the family Pterophoroidea that is found in South Africa.

The moth flies in February. The larvae feed on Drosera.

References

External links
Ten new species of Afrotropical Pterophoridae (Lepidoptera)

Oxyptilini
Moths described in 1926
Endemic moths of South Africa